Between the Parents is a 1938 German drama film directed by Hans Hinrich and starring Willy Fritsch, Jutta Freybe, and Gusti Huber. It was shot at the Babelsberg Studios in Potsdam. The film's sets were designed by the art directors Wilhelm Depenau and Ludwig Reiber.

Synopsis
A doctor of tropical diseases lives a contended life with his wife and young son. However after a car crash with Lisa, a former student of his now working as a journalist, he apparently becomes infatuated with her - putting his family's stability at risk.

Cast

References

Bibliography 
 
 Klaus, Ulrich J. Deutsche Tonfilme: Jahrgang 1938. Klaus-Archiv, 1988.

External links 
 

1938 films
Films of Nazi Germany
German drama films
1938 drama films
1930s German-language films
Films directed by Hans Hinrich
Adultery in films
UFA GmbH films
German black-and-white films
1930s German films
Films shot at Babelsberg Studios